DP2, meaning Development Prototype number 2, was a prototype Type 4 mainline diesel locomotive, built by English Electric in 1962. The engine and electronic systems trialled in DP2 formed the basis for the later , for which it was effectively the prototype. 

Externally DP2 was visually similar to a Class 55 "Deltic" locomotive, as it used a modified Deltic bodyshell, but internally it had a single engine of a different type to the twin-engined Deltics. DP2 was used firstly in trials, and then in ordinary service until 1967, when it was wrecked in a serious accident at Thirsk.

History

Design
The locomotive was built in 1962 by English Electric at their Vulcan Foundry in Newton-le-Willows to demonstrate its wares to British Railways. As the Deltics were then in production, it was decided to produce the locomotive on the same production line; the bodyshell used for DP2 reputedly being the eighteenth made. While DP2 looked like a Deltic in outline, there were many detail differences; particularly the large bodyside radiator vents at one end, and the single roof fan as opposed to the four symmetrically placed fans on the Deltics. These differences revealed that DP2 was totally different from the twin-engined Deltics internally, having only a single prime mover and generator. The loco was later updated with electronic control systems to become the forerunner of the Class 50.

It was initially painted in standard BR Brunswick Green livery and later (from 1965) in two-tone green livery with a light green lower bodyside band.

Operation
Its first test service was on 2 May 1962, running light from Newton-le-Willows to Chester and back. On 11 May, the locomotive was lent to the London Midland Region for crew training where it undertook a few Crewe–Birmingham runs.

From 14 May 1962, BR tested it on regular London Midland Region services out of London Euston and later on the Eastern Region from London King's Cross. Following its first major overhaul in mid-1965 and clad in new two-tone green Deltic livery, it was used on the Sheffield Pullman workings until 1966. It was fitted with electronic tractive effort and wheel-slip control which gave it superior acceleration to a Deltic, in spite of possessing only 82% of the power. It was placed in a Deltic Diagram covering the 01.32 King's Cross - Edinburgh and the 22.50 Edinburgh - King's Cross, These duties were performed quite punctually and without complaint. In August 1966, it was derailed at  station.

Accident
On 31 July 1967 it was involved in a serious accident at Thirsk, colliding at speed with the de-railed Cliffe (Kent) to Uddingston (Glasgow) cement train. DP2 sustained severe front and left hand side damage, and was taken to York shed where it remained sheeted over. The damage proved to be so great that it was considered uneconomical to repair. It was withdrawn from BR service in September 1967 and moved to the Vulcan Foundry where it was stored until it was dismantled in 1968, its reusable parts being provided to the Class 50 pool of spares. Its engine initially went to D417/50 017 'Royal Oak', but ended its working days in D437/50037 'Illustrious'.

Models 
The DP2 "Prototype Deltic" is being made as a kit and ready-to-run in OO gauge by Silver Fox Models.
Ready-to-run models in both liveries are also available from Heljan.

Gallery

References

Sources

Further reading

DP2
English Electric locomotives
Vulcan Foundry locomotives
Co-Co locomotives
Railway locomotives introduced in 1962
Scrapped locomotives
Standard gauge locomotives of Great Britain
Diesel-electric locomotives of Great Britain